Grand Duke Konstantin Nikolayevich of Russia (21 September 1827 – 25 January 1892) was the Emperor's Viceroy of Poland from 1862 to 1863.

Early life 
Konstantin Nikolayevich was born as the second son of Nicholas I and his wife, Charlotte of Prussia, daughter of Frederick William III of Prussia and his first wife, Louise of Mecklenburg-Strelitz.

Biography 
The Grand Duke was a supporter of the liberal (sometimes referred to as "enlightened") bureaucrats during the period of his brother Alexander II's great reforms. He served as chairman of the Imperial Russian Geographical Society (founded in 1845).

In addition to his support of and participation in the 1861 emancipation of the serfs, the Grand Duke also instituted reforms in the Imperial Russian Navy from 1854.

Konstantin's brother, Alexander II of Russia was supposed to have said: "Let the Poles have their own court and intrigues." Though the Grand Duke tried to show a liberal attitude towards the Poles, his efforts came too late and he was recalled with the outbreak of the January Uprising in 1863.

Marriage and issue 
In the Winter Palace in St Petersburg, on 11 September 1848, Konstantin married Alexandra of Saxe-Altenburg, daughter of Joseph, Duke of Saxe-Altenburg and his wife, Duchess Amelia of Württemberg. They had six children:

Grand Duke Nicholas Konstantinovich of Russia (1850–1918)
Olga Konstantinovna, Queen of the Hellenes (1851–1926)
Grand Duchess Vera Konstantinovna of Russia (1854–1912)
Grand Duke Konstantin Konstantinovich of Russia (1858–1915)
Grand Duke Dmitry Konstantinovich of Russia (1860–1919)
Grand Duke Vyacheslav Konstantinovich of Russia (1862–1879); died of brain hemorrhage

At the end of the 1860s, Konstantin embarked on an affair, having an illegitimate daughter, Marie Condousso.

Konstantin had five illegitimate children with his mistress Anna Kuznetsova (1847–1922); they bore the last name Knyazev:
Sergey Konstantinovich Knyazev (1873–1873); died as an infant.
Marina Konstantinovna Knyazeva (8 December 1875 – 8 June 1941); married Alexander Pavlovich Erchov on 23 April 1894. They have nine children.
Anna Konstantinovna Knyazeva (16 March 1878 – 5 February 1920); married Nicholas Lialine on 17 April 1898. They have three children.
Izmail Konstantinovich Knyazev (2 August 1879 – 1885); died of scarlet fever.
Lev Konstantinovich Knyazev (April 1883 – 1885); died of scarlet fever.

Konstantin was the paternal great-great-grandfather of King Charles III of the United Kingdom, since his daughter Olga married George I of Greece, whose son Andrew married Alice Battenberg, and they became the parents of Philip, Charles' father. Through Constantine I of Greece, another son of Olga and George I, Konstantin is also the paternal great-great-grandfather of Queen Sofía of Spain, mother of King Felipe VI.

In Fiction 
The Grand Duke is a central character in Act III of the novel Forty-Ninth by Boris Pronsky and Craig Britton. In the book, Konstantin is the brains behind the liberal reforms of his brother, Russian Emperor Alexander II, as well as the sale of Alaska to the United States.

Honours
National orders and decorations
 Knight of St. Andrew, 1827
 Knight of St. Alexander Nevsky, 1827
 Knight of the White Eagle, 1827
 Knight of St. Anna, 1st Class, 1827
 Knight of St. George, 4th Class, 1849
 Knight of St. Vladimir, 1st Class, 1853
 Knight of St. Stanislaus, 1st Class, 1865

Foreign orders and decorations

Ancestry

References

Chavchavadze, David. The Grand Dukes. Atlantic, 1989. 
Ferrand, Jacques, Descendances naturelles des souverains et grands-ducs de Russie, de 1762 à 1910 : répertoire généalogique,1995.
King, Greg, and Wilson, Penny.  Gilded Prism. Eurohistory, 2006.  
Van Der Kiste, John. The Romanovs 1818–1959. Sutton Publishing, 1999. .
Zeepvat, Charlotte. Romanov Autumn. Sutton Publishing, 2000.

External links

1827 births
1892 deaths
Russian grand dukes
House of Holstein-Gottorp-Romanov
Imperial Russian Navy admirals
Members of the State Council (Russian Empire)
19th-century people from the Russian Empire
Recipients of the Order of the White Eagle (Russia)
Recipients of the Order of St. Anna, 1st class
Recipients of the Order of St. George of the Fourth Degree
Recipients of the Order of St. Vladimir, 1st class
Grand Crosses of the Order of Saint Stephen of Hungary
Knights Cross of the Military Order of Maria Theresa
Grand Croix of the Légion d'honneur
Knights Commander of the Military Order of William
Recipients of the Pour le Mérite (military class)
Children of Nicholas I of Russia
Sons of emperors
Burials at Saints Peter and Paul Cathedral, Saint Petersburg